The Charles Schwab Cup Championship is the final event of the season on the U.S.-based PGA Tour Champions, the world's leading golf tour for male professionals aged 50 and above. Played in late October or early November each year, it is PGA Tour Champions' equivalent of the PGA Tour's Tour Championship, and was formerly known as the Senior Tour Championship. Like the Tour Championship, it has a small field (30 from 1990 through 2015, and 36 from 2016 forward) and no half-way cut.

Through 2015, the top 30 money winners made up the field. Since 2016, 36 golfers have competed, and the event is the final stage of a three-tournament playoff similar to that used by the regular PGA Tour for its FedEx Cup. Through 2015, the tournament had another distinction that made it unique on PGA Tour Champions – it was the only event, other than the tour's five majors, contested over four rounds. In 2016 and 2017, it returned to being held over three rounds. In 2018, it returns to being held over four rounds.  Since 2013, the purse has been $2,500,000, with $440,000 going to the winner.

Tournament hosts

Winners

References

External links
Coverage on PGA Tour Champions' official site
Charles Schwab Cup points list

PGA Tour Champions events
Recurring sporting events established in 1990
Golf tournaments in Puerto Rico
Golf in South Carolina
Golf in Oklahoma
Golf in California
Golf in Arizona
Sports competitions in Oklahoma City
Sports competitions in San Francisco
Sports competitions in Scottsdale, Arizona
1990 establishments in Puerto Rico
Sports competitions in Maricopa County, Arizona